Fangs of Fate may refer to:
 Fangs of Fate (1925 film), an American silent Western film
 Fangs of Fate (1928 film), an American silent action film